The Postmaster General of Canada was the Canadian cabinet minister responsible for the Post Office Department (Canada Post). In 1851, management of the post office was transferred from Britain (Royal Mail) to the provincial governments of the Province of Canada, New Brunswick, Newfoundland, Nova Scotia and Prince Edward Island. The position of Postmaster General was established in each province. With Canadian Confederation in 1867, a single position was created replacing this post in all of the above provinces except Newfoundland; this position was abolished in 1981 when the post office was transformed from a government department into a crown corporation. Since 1981 Canada Post has been led by a President and CEO. From 1900 until 1909 the Postmaster General was also responsible for the Department of Labour. It now reports to the Minister of Public Services and Procurement.

Postmasters General
Alexander Campbell
 under MacDonald (July 1, 1867 – June 30, 1873)
John O'Connor
 under Macdonald (July 1, 1873 – November 5, 1873)
Donald Alexander Macdonald
 under MacKenzie (November 7, 1873 – May 17, 1875)
Télesphore Fournier
 under Mackenzie (May 19, 1875 – October 7, 1875)
Lucius Seth Huntington
 under Mackenzie (October 9, 1875 – October 8, 1878)
Hector Louis Langevin
 under Macdonald (October 19, 1878 – May 19, 1879)
Sir Alexander Campbell
 under Macdonald (May 20, 1879 – January 15, 1880) (second time)
John O'Connor
 under Macdonald (January 16, 1880 – November 7, 1880) (second time)
Sir Alexander Campbell
 under Macdonald (November 8, 1880 – May 18, 1881) (third time)
John O'Connor
 under Macdonald (May 20, 1881 – May 22, 1882) (third time)
John Carling
 under Macdonald (May 23, 1882 – September 24, 1885)
Sir Alexander Campbell
 under Macdonald (September 25, 1885 – January 26, 1887) (fourth time)
Archibald McLelan
 under Macdonald (January 27, 1887 – July 9, 1888)
John Carling
 under Macdonald (July 11, 1888 – August 5, 1888) (second time)
John Graham Haggart
 under Macdonald (August 6, 1888 – June 6, 1891)
 under Abbott (June 16, 1891 – January 24, 1892)
Sir Joseph Philippe René Adolphe Caron
 under Abbott (January 25, 1892 – November 24, 1892)
 under Thompson (December 5, 1892 – December 12, 1894)
Louis-Olivier Taillon
 under Mackenzie Bowell (December 21, 1894 – July 8, 1896)
Sir William Mulock
 under Laurier (July 13, 1896 – October 15, 1905)
Allen Bristol Aylesworth
 under Laurier (October 16, 1905 – June 3, 1906)
Rodolphe Lemieux
 under Laurier (June 4, 1906 – August 10, 1911)
Henri Sévérin Béland
 under Laurier (August 19, 1911 – October 6, 1911)
Louis-Philippe Pelletier
 under Borden (October 10, 1911 – October 19, 1914)
Thomas Chase-Casgrain
 under Borden (October 20, 1914 – December 29, 1916)
Pierre Édouard Blondin
 under Borden (January 8, 1917 – July 10, 1920)
 under Meighen (July 10, 1920 – September 20, 1921)
Louis-de-Gonzague Belley
 under Meighen (September 21, 1921 – December 29, 1921)
Charles Murphy
 under King (December 29, 1921 – June 28, 1926)
Robert James Manion
 under Meighen (August 23, 1926 – September 25, 1926)
Peter John Veniot
 under King (September 25, 1926 – August 7, 1930)
Arthur Sauvé
 under Bennett (August 7, 1930 – August 13, 1935)
Samuel Gobeil
 under Bennett (August 16, 1935 – October 23, 1935)
John Campbell Elliott
 under King (October 23, 1935 – January 22, 1939)
Norman Alexander McLarty
 under King (January 23, 1939 – September 18, 1939)
Charles Gavan Power
 under King (September 19, 1939 – May 22, 1940)
James Lorimer Ilsley
 (acting)
 under King (May 23, 1940 – July 7, 1940)
William Pate Mulock
 under King (July 8, 1940 – June 8, 1945)
Ernest Bertrand
 under King (August 29, 1945 – November 15, 1948)
 under St. Laurent (November 15, 1948 – August 23, 1949)
Gabriel Édouard Rinfret
 under St. Laurent (August 25, 1949 – February 12, 1952)
Alcide Côté
 under St. Laurent (February 13, 1952 – August 7, 1955)
Roch Pinard
 (acting)
 under St. Laurent (August 16, 1955 – November 2, 1955)
Hugues Lapointe
 under St. Laurent (November 3, 1955 – June 21, 1957)
William McLean Hamilton
 under Diefenbaker (June 21, 1957 – July 12, 1962)
John Angus MacLean
 (acting)
 under Diefenbaker (July 18, 1962 – August 8, 1962)
Ellen Louks Fairclough
 under Diefenbaker (August 9, 1962 – April 22, 1963)
Azellus Denis
 under Pearson (April 22, 1963 – February 2, 1964)
John Robert Nicholson
 under Pearson (February 2, 1964 – February 14, 1965)
René Tremblay
 under Pearson (February 15, 1965 – December 17, 1965)
Joseph Julien Jean-Pierre Côté
 under Pearson (December 18, 1965 – April 20, 1968)
 under Trudeau (April 20, 1968 – July 5, 1968)
Eric William Kierans
 under Trudeau (July 5, 1968 – April 28, 1971)
Joseph Julien Jean-Pierre Côté
 under Trudeau (April 29, 1971 – November 26, 1972) (second time)
André Ouellet
 under Trudeau (November 27, 1972 – August 7, 1974)
Bryce Stuart Mackasey
 under Trudeau (August 8, 1974 – September 13, 1976)
Jean-Jacques Blais
 under Trudeau (September 14, 1976 – February 1, 1978)
Gilles Lamontagne
 under Trudeau (February 2, 1978 – June 3, 1979)
John Allen Fraser
 under Clark (June 4, 1979 – March 2, 1980)
 André Ouellet
 under Trudeau (March 3, 1980 – October 15, 1981) (second time)

Canada Post Corporation has had its own CEO and President since 1981, who has most of the administrative responsibilities previously exercised by the Postmaster General. With the abolition of the position of Postmaster General the legislative and certain other duties previously exercised by the Postmaster General were transferred to the new position of Minister responsible for Canada Post Corporation.

See also
List of Postmasters General for the Province of Canada

External links 
A Chronology of Canadian Postal History